Zsuzsa Verőci (born February 19, 1949) is a Hungarian chess Woman International Master (1969) and Woman Grandmaster (1978). She has also been a FIDE International Arbiter since 1995. Her current FIDE rating is 2253 and her peak rating, from July 2003 to April 2004, was 2315. She was born February 19, 1949, in Budapest, Hungary.

Veroci has represented Hungary ten times in the Women's Chess Olympiad between 1966 and 1992, winning three individual silver medals and two individual bronze.

References

External links
 

1949 births
Living people
Chess woman grandmasters
Hungarian female chess players
Chess arbiters
Chess Olympiad competitors
Sportspeople from Budapest